The 2019–20 Copa Argentina (officially the Copa Argentina AXION energy 2019–20 for sponsorship reasons) was the eleventh edition of the Copa Argentina, and the ninth since the relaunch of the tournament in 2011. The competition began on 15 January 2020 and ended on 8 December 2021. On 17 March 2020, the Argentine Football Association (AFA) announced the suspension of the tournament to prevent the spread of the coronavirus COVID-19. After several months the tournament resumed on 23 December 2020.

Originally, the champions would qualify for the 2021 Copa Libertadores, however on 11 December 2020 the Copa Argentina organizers announced that the 2019–20 edition would not end before the beginning of the 2021 Copa Libertadores. Therefore, AFA decided that the Copa Argentina berth for the 2021 Copa Libertadores would be reallocated to the best team of the 2019–20 Superliga Argentina and 2020 Copa de la Superliga aggregate table not yet qualified and that the champions would qualify for the 2022 Copa Libertadores instead, as proposed to AFA by the Copa Argentina organizers. River Plate were the defending champions but they were eliminated in the round of 16.

Boca Juniors defeated Talleres (C) in the final on penalties to win their fourth tournament title. As champions, they qualified for the 2022 Copa Libertadores group stage and the 2021 Supercopa Argentina.

Teams
Seventy-seven teams took part in this competition: All twenty-four teams from the Primera División; fourteen teams of the Primera Nacional; six from the Primera B, four from the Primera C; three from the Primera D and twenty-six teams from Federal A.

First Level

Primera División
All twenty-four teams of 2019–20 tournament qualified.

 Aldosivi
 Argentinos Juniors
 Arsenal
 Atlético Tucumán
 Banfield
 Boca Juniors
 Central Córdoba (SdE)
 Colón
 Defensa y Justicia
 Estudiantes (LP)
 Gimnasia y Esgrima (LP)
 Godoy Cruz
 Huracán
 Independiente
 Lanús
 Newell's Old Boys
 Patronato
 Racing Club
 River Plate
 Rosario Central
 San Lorenzo
 Talleres (C)
 Unión
 Vélez Sarsfield

Second Level

Primera Nacional
The top-seven teams of each zone at the 15th round of 2019–20 tournament qualified.

 Alvarado
 Atlanta
 Atlético de Rafaela
 Defensores de Belgrano
 Deportivo Riestra
 Estudiantes (BA)
 Estudiantes (RC)
  Instituto
 Platense
 San Martín (SJ)
 San Martín (T)
 Sarmiento (J)
 Temperley
  Tigre

Third Level

Primera B Metropolitana
The top-six teams at the 17th round of 2019–20 Primera B tournament qualified.

 Almirante Brown
 Comunicaciones
 J. J. Urquiza
 San Telmo
 Talleres (RdE)
 Villa San Carlos

Torneo Federal A
The top-thirteen teams of each zone at the 15th round of 2019–20 tournament qualified.

 Boca Unidos
 Central Norte
 Chaco For Ever
 Cipolletti
 Círculo Deportivo
 Crucero del Norte
 Defensores (P)
 Defensores de Belgrano (VR)
 Deportivo Camioneros
 Deportivo Madryn
 Deportivo Maipú
 Desamparados
 Douglas Haig
 Estudiantes (SL)
 Ferro Carril Oeste (GP)
 Güemes (SdE)
 Huracán Las Heras
 San Martín (F)
 Sansinena
 Sarmiento (R)
 Sol de Mayo
 Sportivo Belgrano
 Sportivo Las Parejas
 Sportivo Peñarol
 Unión (S)
 Villa Mitre

Fourth Level

Primera C Metropolitana
The top-four teams at the 19th round of 2019–20 Primera C tournament qualified.

 Cañuelas
 Dock Sud
 Laferrere
 Real Pilar

Fifth Level

Primera D Metropolitana
The top-three teams at the 13th round of 2019–20 Primera D tournament qualified.

 Claypole
 Liniers
 Sportivo Barracas

Round and draw dates

Regional Round
This round was organized by the Consejo Federal.

Round I
In the Round I, 26 teams from Torneo Federal A participated. The round was played between 15 January and 19 February 2020, on a home-and-away two-legged tie. The 13 winning teams advanced to the Final Round.

|-

|-

|-

|-

|-

|-

|-

|-

|-

|-

|-

|-

|-

|}

First leg

Second leg

Final Rounds

Draw
The draw for the Final Rounds was held on 30 January 2020, 18:00 at AFA Futsal Stadium in Ezeiza. The 64 qualified teams were divided in four groups. Teams were seeded by their historical performance and Division. Champions of AFA tournaments playing in Argentine Primera División were allocated to Group A. The matches were drawn from the respective confronts: A vs. C; B vs. D. Some combinations were avoided for security reasons.

Bracket

Upper bracket

Lower bracket

Round of 64
The Round of 64 had 13 qualified teams from the Regional Round (13 teams from Torneo Federal A), 13 qualified teams from the Metropolitan Zone (6 teams from Primera B Metropolitana; 4 teams from Primera C and 3 teams from Primera D), 14 teams from Primera B Nacional and 24 teams from Primera División. The round was played between 25 February 2020 and 17 March 2021, in a single knock-out match format. The 32 winning teams advanced to the Round of 32.

Round of 32
This round had 32 qualified teams from the Round of 64. The round was played between 17 March and 4 August 2021, in a single knock-out match format. The 16 winning teams advanced to the Round of 16.

Round of 16
This round had the 16 qualified teams from the Round of 32. The round was played between 13 July and 22 September 2021, in a single knock-out match format. The 8 winning teams advanced to the Quarterfinals.

Quarterfinals
This round had the 8 qualified teams from the Round of 16. The round was played between 22 September and 13 October 2021, in a single knock-out match format. The 4 winning teams advanced to the Semifinals.

Semifinals
This round had the 4 qualified teams from the Quarterfinals. The round was played between 3 November and 1 December 2021, in a single knock-out match format. The 2 winning teams advanced to the Final.

Final

Top goalscorers

Team of the tournament

See also
 2019–20 Argentine Primera División
 2019–20 Primera B Nacional
 2019–20 Torneo Federal A

References

External links
 Official site 
 Copa Argentina on the Argentine Football Association's website 

2019
Argentina
2019 in Argentine football
2020 in Argentine football
2021 in Argentine football
Copa Argentina